Anastasiya Kozhenkova (born 19 January 1986 in Kovel, Volyn Oblast, Ukraine) is a Ukrainian rower. She won a gold medal at the 2012 Summer Olympics in the quadruple sculls event with Kateryna Tarasenko, Nataliya Dovhodko, and Yana Dementyeva.

References

External links
 

1986 births
Living people
Olympic rowers of Ukraine
Olympic gold medalists for Ukraine
Olympic medalists in rowing
People from Kovel
Rowers at the 2012 Summer Olympics
Rowers at the 2016 Summer Olympics
Ukrainian female rowers
Medalists at the 2012 Summer Olympics
World Rowing Championships medalists for Ukraine
Sportspeople from Volyn Oblast